Lords of Rock is a Swiss rock online magazine, updated daily. It publishes cd reviews, interviews, reports from festivals and news. It is a collaborative work of about 20 Swiss and French reporters, editors, coordinators and the webmaster. The journal was founded in June 2006 by three people from the Lausanne area in Switzerland.

References

Swiss music guide 2007/2008. Swiss music guide.

External links
Official Website (in French)

2006 establishments in Switzerland
Magazines established in 2006
Mass media in Lausanne
Online music magazines
Swiss music websites